Otherwise is an American hard rock band from Las Vegas, Nevada. They have released three full-length albums on the Sony Music-owned label Century Media Records, titled True Love Never Dies (2012), Peace at All Costs (2014), Sleeping Lions (2017), and Defy (2019) on Mascot Records. Prior to signing their record deal with Century Media, as an unsigned band they released one self-titled full-length album (2006) and one EP titled Some Kind of Alchemy (2009). The band's hit song “Soldiers” was debuted on Sirius XM Octane by Jose Mangin. The band is the first unsigned artist to chart #1 on Sirius XM Octane with the song “Soldiers”.

In 2018, it was announced that the band had signed to Mascot Records, with a new studio album released on the label on November 8, 2019. The band has release 3 new singles in 2022, Full Disclosure, Exit Wound & Coffins. A new album is set to release in 2023.

Members
Current members
 Adrian Patrick – lead vocals (2003–present)
 Ryan Patrick – lead guitar, backing vocals (2004–present)
 Joe Conner - drums (2019–present)

Former members
 Ted Carrasco – rhythm guitar (2003–2007)
 Ray Kemple – bass (2004)
 Alan Doucette – drums (2004–2007)
 Nick Bedrosian – bass, backing vocals (2019-2022)
 Don "DW" King – bass, backing vocals (2004–2007)
 Radley Griego – bass (2007)
 Walker Warren – rhythm guitar (2007)
 Jason Juadines – rhythm guitar, backing vocals (2007–2011)
 Flavio Ivan Mendoza – bass, backing vocals (2007–2012)
 Dave McMahan – drums, backing vocals (2007–2010)
 Corky Gainsford – drums, backing vocals (2010–2015)
 Vassilios Metropolous – rhythm guitar (2011–2012), bass (2012–2014), backing vocals (2011–2014)
 Andrew Pugh – rhythm guitar, backing vocals (2012–2016)
 Tony "The Beast" Carboney – bass guitar, Backing Vocals (2015–2019)
 Brian Medeiros – drums (2016–2019)
 Joe Hardy - lead guitar (1998-2003)
 Ray Kemple - bass (2000-2003)

Timeline

Discography

Studio albums

Extended plays

Singles

Music videos

References 

American hard rock musical groups
Musical groups established in 2006
Another Century Records artists